The following is an episode list for the television show The Kids in the Hall. 109 episodes have been produced, plus 9 compilation episodes.

Some episodes had two versions, an American version and a Canadian version, often with alternate sketches. This episode guide is based on the official DVD releases. The first three seasons use the American versions of the episodes because HBO would allow more to be shown than the CBC. Seasons 4 and 5 use the Canadian versions because the CBC allowed more to be shown than CBS.

The series was picked up for a sixth season in 2020 by Amazon Prime Video; it premiered May 13, 2022.

Series overview

Episodes

Pilot (1988)

Season 1 (1989–90)

Season 2 (1990–91)

Season 3 (1991–92)

Season 4 (1993–94)

Season 5 (1994–95)

Season 6 (2022)

References

Kids in the Hall
Episodes
Kids